Masaiti is a constituency of the National Assembly of Zambia. It covers the towns of Masaiti and Milomwe in Copperbelt Province.

List of MPs

References

Constituencies of the National Assembly of Zambia
Constituencies established in 1973
1973 establishments in Zambia